The Union Public School District is a comprehensive community public school district that serves students in pre-kindergarten through twelfth grade from Union Township, in Union County, New Jersey, United States.

As of the 2018–19 school year, the district, comprising 10 schools, had an enrollment of 7,219 students and 614.7 classroom teachers (on an FTE basis), for a student–teacher ratio of 11.7:1.

The district is classified by the New Jersey Department of Education as being in District Factor Group "DE", the fifth-highest of eight groupings. District Factor Groups organize districts statewide to allow comparison by common socioeconomic characteristics of the local districts. From lowest socioeconomic status to highest, the categories are A, B, CD, DE, FG, GH, I and J.

Union was threatened with being the first town north of the Mason–Dixon line to suffer from penalties as a result of school segregation. The area of Vauxhall was primarily black and Jefferson Elementary School was disproportionately black compared to the rest of the town. Union avoided problems by converting Jefferson Elementary into a sixth-grade only school called Central 6 and bused all children in the district in 6th grade to Jefferson Elementary School. It was later renamed Central 5 housing all fifth-grade students because the two junior highs, Burnet and Kawameeh, became middle schools and took on sixth grade students.

Schools
The schools in the district (with 2018–19 enrollment data from the National Center for Education Statistics) are:
Elementary schools
Battle Hill Elementary School (391 students; in grades PreK-4)
Althea Bossard, Principal
Hannah Caldwell Elementary School (508; PreK-4)
Kathryn DiGiovanni, Principal
Connecticut Farms Elementary School (403; PreK-4)
Michelle C. Osborne-Warren, Principal
Franklin Elementary School (417; PreK-4)
 Kira Baskerville-Williams, Principal
Livingston Elementary School (424; PreK-4)
Benjamin Kloc, Principal
Washington Elementary School (575; PreK-4)
Thomas O. Matthews, Principal
Jefferson Elementary School (544; in grade 5)
Laura Damato, Principal
Middle schools
Burnet Middle School (961; 6–8)
David Shaw, Principal
Kawameeh Middle School (674; 6–8)
Jason Malanda, Principal
High school
Union High School (2,180; 9–12)
Mark Hoyt, Interim Principal

Administration
Core members of the district's administration are:
Dr. Scott Taylor, Superintendent
Gerry Benaquista, Assistant Superintendent
Yolanda Koon, School Business Administrator / Board Secretary

Board of education
The district's board of education, with nine members, sets policy and oversees the fiscal and educational operation of the district through its administration. As a Type II school district, the board's trustees are elected directly by voters to serve three-year terms of office on a staggered basis, with three seats up for election each year held (since 2012) as part of the November general election.

References

External links
Union Public School District

School Data for the Union Public School District, National Center for Education Statistics

Union Township, Union County, New Jersey
New Jersey District Factor Group DE
School districts in Union County, New Jersey